Leo Auva'a (born 16 August 1984) is a former rugby union footballer from New Zealand who last played for Benetton Treviso.
After failing to break into the Senior Wellington NPC side, Leo Auva'a left for Ireland after receiving an offer to join AIL side, Old Belvedere RFC.

Leo Auva'a, who won the 2010/2011 'AIL league' with Old Belvedere, featured in 3 of Leinster 'A' games during the 2010/2011 season as an unsigned player. Auva'a was subsequently signed by Leinster in the summer of 2011 as cover for the players departing for the Rugby World Cup. He has since made numerous appearances in the No.8 jersey in the absence of Irish International Jamie Heaslip. To date, Auva'a has played and scored for the senior side and has also appeared for the Leinster 'A' side, including playing in the British and Irish Cup, and in friendlies.

Due to the residency rules set out by the IRB, Leo Auva'a is qualified to play for Ireland.

References

1984 births
Living people
Leinster Rugby players
Rugby union number eights
Old Belvedere R.F.C. players
Rugby union players from Lower Hutt